Cosmosoma annexa is a moth of the family Erebidae. It was described by Gottlieb August Wilhelm Herrich-Schäffer in 1854. It is found in Rio de Janeiro, Brazil.

References

annexa
Moths described in 1854